In Old Sacramento is a 1946 American Western film directed by Joseph Kane and written by Frances Hyland and Frank Gruber. The film stars Wild Bill Elliott, Constance Moore, Henry H. Daniels Jr., Ruth Donnelly, Eugene Pallette and Jack La Rue. The film was released on May 31, 1946, by Republic Pictures.

Plot

Cast  
Wild Bill Elliott as Johnny Barrett / Spanish Jack 
Constance Moore as Belle Malone
Henry H. Daniels Jr. as Sam Chase 
Ruth Donnelly as Zebby Booker
Eugene Pallette as Sheriff Jim Wales
Jack La Rue as Laramie 
Grant Withers as Captain Mark Slayter
Charles Judels as Tony Marchetti
Paul Hurst as Stagecoach Driver
Lionel Stander as Eddie Dodge
Robert Blake as Newsboy 
Dick Wessel as Oscar

References

External links 
 

1946 films
American Western (genre) films
1946 Western (genre) films
Republic Pictures films
Films directed by Joseph Kane
American black-and-white films
1940s English-language films
1940s American films